A bilingual pun is a pun created by a word or phrase in one language sounding similar to a different word or phrase in another language. The result of a bilingual pun is often a joke that makes sense in more than one language. A bilingual pun can be made with a word from another language that has the same meaning, or an opposite meaning.

Description
A bilingual pun involves a word from one language which has the same or similar meaning in another language's word. The word is often homophonic whether on purpose or by accident. Another feature of the bilingual pun is that the person does not need to have the ability to speak both languages in order to understand the pun. The bilingual pun can also demonstrate common ground with a person who speaks another language.

Examples

Biblical
There are what appear to be Biblical bilingual puns. In Exodus 10:10 Moses is warned by the Egyptian Pharaoh that evil awaits him. In Hebrew the word "Ra" means evil, but in Egyptian "Ra" is the sun god. So when Moses was warned the word "ra" can mean the sun god stands in the way, or evil stands in the way.

Literature
Unintentional bilingual puns occur in translations of one of Shakespeare's plays: Henry V. The line spoken by Katherine, "I cannot speak your England" becomes political in French.

See also 
 Calque
 Code mixing
 Eggcorn
 Homophonic translation
 Lists of English words by country or language of origin
 Loanword
 Macaronic language
 Phono-semantic matching
 Soramimi
 Translation

References

Bibliography

External links
 7 Puns That Make Sense in More Than One Language

Category
Puns
Macaronic language
Homophonic translation
Sociolinguistics
Semantics
Pidgins and creoles
Linguistic morphology
Word coinage
Linguistic typology
Linguistic purism